Faisel Al-Khori (Arabic:قيصل الخوري; born 6 February 1996) is an Emirati footballer plays for Gulf Heroes.

References

Emirati footballers
1996 births
Living people
Al Jazira Club players
Baniyas Club players
Al-Taawon (UAE) Club players
Masafi Club players
Gulf Heroes FC players
UAE First Division League players
UAE Pro League players
Association football wingers